Hakea marginata is a shrub in the family,  Proteaceae and is endemic  to an area in the Mid West, Wheatbelt, Peel, South West, Great Southern and Goldfields-Esperance regions of Western Australia.

Description
It blooms from August to October and produces sweet scented white or creamy yellow flowers in clusters in leaf axils in upper branchlets. The marginal and central veins are a prominent yellow.

Taxonomy and naming
The species was first formally described in 1810 by Scottish botanist Robert Brown and the description was published in  Transactions of the Linnean Society of London. Named from the Latin marginatus - with a border, referring to the margin surrounding the leaf.

Distribution and habitat
Found widely in Western Australia bounded by Jurien Bay, Kalgoorlie and Cape Arid National Park. Grows in heath or woodland on sand and loans with clay and gravel along road verges, in waterways and creek gullies. This species may grow into impenetrable thickets good for wildlife habitat.

Conservation status
Hakea marginata is classified as "not threatened" by the Western Australian Government.

References

marginata
Eudicots of Western Australia
Plants described in 1810
Taxa named by Robert Brown (botanist, born 1773)